The American Council of Life Insurers (ACLI) is a Washington, D.C.-based lobbying and trade group for the life insurance industry. ACLI represents 290 insurance companies that account for 95 percent of the U.S. life insurance industry's total assets.  According to its website, ACLI represents "legal reserve life insurance companies and fraternal benefit societies operating in the United States before federal and state policymakers, insurance departments, and the courts." The group was founded in 1976.

Susan K. Neely is the organization's president and chief executive officer. She succeeded former Governor of Idaho Dirk Kempthorne, who led ACLI from 2010 to 2018. Prior to that, former Oklahoma Governor Frank Keating led ACLI from 2002 through 2010.

Legislation
Insurance Capital Standards Clarification Act of 2014 (S. 2270; 113th Congress) - ACLI lobbied in favor of this bill, buying advertisements in several Washington, D.C. newspapers. ACLI stated that "there is broad agreement on this position... The Obama administration, Democrats and Republicans in the House and the Senate, state and federal regulators and private industry all agree that life insurers should not be subject to capital standards more suited for the business of banking."

External links
 ACLI Website

References

Trade associations based in the United States
Lobbying organizations in the United States
Life insurance